Earle Brown (December 26, 1926 – July 2, 2002) was an American composer who established his own formal and notational systems. Brown was the creator of "open form," a style of musical construction that has influenced many composers since—notably the downtown New York scene of the 1980s (see John Zorn) and generations of younger composers.

Among his most famous works are December 1952, an entirely graphic score, and the open form pieces Available Forms I & II, Centering, and Cross Sections and Color Fields. He was awarded a Foundation for Contemporary Arts John Cage Award (1998).

Life
Brown was born in Lunenburg, Massachusetts, and first devoted himself to playing jazz. He initially considered a career in engineering, and enrolled for engineering and mathematics at Northeastern University (1944–45). He enlisted in the U.S. Air Force in 1945. However, the war ended while he was still in basic training, and he was assigned to the base band at Randolph Field, Texas, in which he played trumpet. The band included saxophonist Zoot Sims.  Between 1946 and 1950 he was a student at Schillinger House in Boston, which is now the Berklee College of Music. Brown had private instruction in trumpet and composition.  Upon graduating he moved to Denver to teach Schillinger techniques. John Cage invited Brown to leave Denver and join him for the Project for Music for Magnetic Tape in New York. Brown was an editor and recording engineer for Capitol Records (1955–60) and producer for Time-Mainstream Records (1960–73).

Brown's contact with Cage exposed David Tudor to some of Brown's early piano works, and this connection led to Brown's work being performed in Darmstadt and Donaueschingen. Composers such as Pierre Boulez and Bruno Maderna promoted his music, which subsequently became more widely performed and published.

Brown is considered to be a member of the New York School of composers, along with John Cage, Morton Feldman, and Christian Wolff. Brown cited the visual artists Alexander Calder and Jackson Pollock as two of the primary influences on his work. He was also inspired by author, Gertrude Stein, and by many artists he was personally acquainted with such as Max Ernst and Robert Rauschenberg.

Brown was married first to the dancer Carolyn Brown, who danced with Merce Cunningham from the 1950s to the 1970s, and then to the art curator Susan Sollins. Earle Brown died in 2002 of cancer, in Rye, New York, United States.

Open form

A great deal of Brown's work is composed in fixed modules (though often with idiosyncratic mixtures of notation), but the order is left free to be chosen by the conductor during performance. The material is divided in numbered "events" on a series of "pages". The conductor uses a placard to indicate the page, and with his left hand indicates which event is to be performed while his right hand cues a downbeat to begin. The speed and intensity of the downbeat suggests the tempo and dynamics.

Brown's first open-form piece, Twenty-Five Pages, was 25 unbound pages, and called for anywhere between one and 25 pianists. The score allowed the performer(s) to arrange the pages in whatever order they saw fit. Also, the pages were notated symmetrically and without clefs so that the top and bottom orientation was reversible.

Through this procedure, no two performances of an open form Brown score are the same, yet each piece retains a singular identity and his works exhibit great variety from work to work. Brown relates his work in open form to a combination of Alexander Calder's mobile sculptures and the spontaneous decision making used in the creation of Jackson Pollock's action paintings.

Notation
Although Brown precisely notated compositions throughout his career using traditional notation, he also was an inventor and early practitioner of various innovative notations.

In Twenty-Five Pages, and in other works, Brown used what he called "time notation" or "proportional notation" where rhythms were indicated by their horizontal length and placement in relation to each other and were to be interpreted flexibly. However, by Modules I and II (1966), Brown more often used stemless note heads which could be interpreted with even greater flexibility.

In 1959, with Hodograph I, Brown sketched the contour and character abstractly in what he called "implicit areas" of the piece. This graphic style was more gestural and calligraphic than the geometric abstraction of December 1952. Beginning with Available Forms I, Brown used this graphic notation on the staff in some sections of the score.

December 1952 and FOLIO
December 1952 is perhaps Brown's most famous score. It is part of a larger set of unusually notated music called FOLIO. Although this collection is misconstrued as coming out of nowhere historically, music notation has existed in many forms—both as a mechanism for creation and analysis. Brown studied what is now called Early Music, which had its own systems of notation, and was a student of the Schillinger System, which almost exclusively used graph methods for describing music. From this perspective FOLIO was an inspired, yet logical connection to be made—especially for a Northeasterner who grew up playing and improvising jazz.

December 1952 consists purely of horizontal and vertical lines varying in width, spread out over the page; it is a landmark piece in the history of graphic notation of music. The role of the performer is to interpret the score visually and translate the graphical information to music. In Brown's notes on the work he even suggests that one consider this 2D space as 3D and imagine moving through it. The other pieces in the collection are not as abstract.  According to dates on the scores, Brown wrote December 1952 and then moved back towards forms of notation that contain more specific musical information.

Other activities
Fromm Music Foundation: Co-director from 1984 to 1989. Commissioned new works by Henry Brant, Luciano Berio, John Cage, Ornette Coleman, David Lang, Alvin Lucier, Tod Machover, Steve Mackey, Steve Reich, William Susman, James Tenney and Joan Tower.
American Music Center: President from 1986 to 1989.
Time-Mainstream: Repertory director for new-music recordings between 1960 and 1973. Oversaw the label's recordings of works by 49 composers from 16 countries, among them Charles Ives, John Cage, Luigi Nono, Bruno Maderna, Karlheinz Stockhausen, Luciano Berio and Iannis Xenakis and the first commercial recordings of Giacinto Scelsi, Christian Wolff and Sylvano Bussotti. Wergo has re-issued all 18 of the recordings on six box sets.
Composer-in-residence / or visiting professor at: California Institute of the Arts, UC Berkeley, Peabody Conservatory, Rotterdam Kunststichting, the Basel Conservatory of Music, Yale University, Indiana University, Harvard University, the American Academy in Rome, Aspen, Hochschule fur Musik, University of Cincinnati, and Tanglewood.<ref>Amy C. Beal, "An Interview with Earle Brown", Contemporary Music Review 26, nos. 3 & 4 (June 2007): 341–356. Citation on p. 356.</ref>
Notable students: Joe Jones, Paul Dresher, Michael Daugherty, Sarah Meneely Kyder, George Brunner. 

WorksHome Burial (1949), for pianoThree Pieces for Piano (1951)Music for Violin, Cello & Piano (1952)Perspectives (1952), for pianoTwenty-Five Pages  (1953), for 1–25 pianosOctet I (1953), for eight magnetic tapes and eight loudspeakersIndices (1954), for chamber orchestraForgotten Piece (1954), for pianoFolio and 4 Systems (1954), for variable instrumentationIndices [Piano Reduction] (1954)Octet II (1954), for eight magnetic tapes and eight loudspeakersMusic for Cello and Piano (1955)Four More (1956), for pianoThe Kind of Bird I Am (1957), for orchestraPentathis (1958), for chamber ensembleHodograph I (1959), for chamber ensembleAvailable Forms I (1961), for chamber orchestraAvailable Forms II (1962), for two orchestrasNovara (1962), for chamber ensembleFrom Here (1963), for chamber orchestraTimes Five (1963), for chamber ensembleCorroboree (1964), for three or two pianosNine Rarebits (1965), for one or two harpsichordsString Quartet (1965)Calder Piece (1966), for four percussionists and mobileModule I (1966), for orchestraModule II (1966), for orchestraEvent: Synergy II (1967), for chamber ensembleModule III (1969), for orchestraSmall Pieces for Large Chorus (1969)Syntagm III (1970), for chamber ensembleNew Piece (1971), for variable instrumentationNew Piece Loops (1972), for orchestra and chorusSign Sounds (1972), for chamber orchestraTime Spans (1972), for orchestraCentering (1973), for solo violin and ensembleCross Sections and Color Fields (1975), for orchestraWikiup (1979), sound installation for six independent playing devicesWindsor Jambs (1980), for chamber ensembleFolio II (1982), for variable instrumentationSounder Rounds (1983), for orchestraTracer (1985), for chamber ensembleOh, K (1992), for chamber ensembleTracking Pierrot (1992), for chamber ensembleSummer Suite '95 (1995), for pianoSpecial Events (1999), for chamber ensemble

Selected discography
 The New York School (includes compositions by John Cage, Morton Feldman, Christian Wolff), hatART, 1993.
 The New York School 2 (includes compositions by John Cage, Morton Feldman, Christian Wolff), hatART, 1995.
 Four Systems, hatART, 1995. (With Eberhard Blum, flutist),
 Synergy, hatART, 1995. (With Ensemble Avantgarde)
 Earle Brown: Music for Piano(s), 1951–1995, New Albion, 1996. (With David Arden, pianist; John Yaffé, producer)
 Brown: Centering: Windsor Jambs; Tracking Pierrot; Event: Synergy II, Newport, 1998.
 American Masters Series: Earle Brown, CRI, 2000.
 Earle Brown: Selected Works 1952–1965 (2006)
 Folio and Four Systems (2006)
 Earle Brown: Chamber Works (2007) DVD
 Earle Brown: Tracer (2007)
 Wergo Contemporary Sound Series, recorded from 1960–1973: Earle Brown – A Life in Music (3 CDs each): Vol. 1, Vol. 2, Vol. 3, Vol. 4, Vol. 5, Vol. 6

References

Further reading
 Albertson, Dan (ed.). 2007. "Earle Brown: From Motets to Mathematics". Contemporary Music Review 26, issues 3 & 4
 Hoek, D. J. 2004. "Documenting the International Avant Garde: Earle Brown and the Time-Mainstream Contemporary Sound Series". Notes 61, no. 2 (December): 350–360.
 Nicholls, David. 2001. "Brown, Earle (Appleton)". The New Grove Dictionary of Music and Musicians, second edition, edited by Stanley Sadie and John Tyrrell. London: Macmillan.
 Nyman, Michael. 1999. Experimental Music: Cage and Beyond, second edition. Cambridge and New York: Cambridge University Press.
 Ryan, David. n.d. "Earle Brown: A Sketch". Liner notes essay. New World Records.
 Welsh, John P. 1994. "Open Form and Earle Brown's Modules I and II (1967)". Perspectives of New Music 32, no. 1 (Fall): 254–290.
 Yaffé, John. 2007. "An Interview with Earle Brown." Contemporary Music Review'' 26, issues 3 & 4

External links
Earle Brown Music Foundation (many lengthy audio interviews and lectures in the Online Archive section)
Art of the States: Earle Brown three works by the composer
Earle Brown interview
Del Sol Quartet: Tear includes Brown's 1965 String Quartet performed by Del Sol Quartet
December 52, with original notes, and sound from the Darmstadt 1964 performance, UbuWeb
Beyond Notation: An Earle Brown Symposium at Northeastern University, January 18–19, 2013
Interview with Earle Brown, December 12, 1991

1926 births
2002 deaths
American male classical composers
American classical composers
20th-century classical composers
People from Lunenburg, Massachusetts
Tzadik Records artists
Berklee College of Music alumni
Deaths from cancer in New York (state)
20th-century American composers
Classical musicians from Massachusetts
20th-century American male musicians